VIAG can refer to:

 The ICAO airport code for Agra Airport in India
 VIAG, a German energy corporation that merged with VEBA in 2000 to form E.ON